ChicagoFest was a Chicago music festival established in 1978 by Mayor Michael Bilandic. It was a two-week event held annually at Navy Pier that featured sixteen separate stages, each sponsored by a national retail brand and a media sponsor compatible to the stage's format, e.g. Rock WLUP, Chicago Tribune Jazz, Miller Brewing Company Blues and WXRT, that broadcast live from the festival. The stages were: Rock, Classic Rock, Country, Blues, Comedy, Roller Disco, Pin Ball Arcade, Jazz, Children's, Variety, Ethnic, as well as a Main stage seating 30,000. There were approximately 600 concert performances by headline artists produced each year.

History
Some of the hundreds of superstars that appeared over the years were Frank Sinatra, The Beach Boys, The Doobie Brothers, Carole King, George Burns, Orleans, Chicago, REO Speedwagon, Willie Nelson with Waylon Jennings, The Blues Brothers, Bobby Vinton, Journey, The Commodores, Kool and The Gang, the Chicago Symphony Orchestra, Charlie Daniels Band, Alice Cooper, Cheap Trick, Aretha Franklin, Ben Vereen, Dick Clark and Muddy Waters and a live TV broadcast of Bozo's Circus and productions for HBO and PBS.

In addition to its 30,000 seat Main Stage, ChicagoFest featured 16 other stage areas that seated 2,500 to 5,000, that presented nationally known recording artists. Iron Maiden, Spyro Gyra, Chick Corea and Gary Burton - Jazz, Joan Jett, .38 Special and Point Blank, The Joe Perry Project, The Scorpions, Krokus, Wet Willie, and many more on the Rocks, Asleep at the Wheel, Carl Perkins, and Bullseye on the Country Stage. The Buckinghams and Jan & Dean were among oldies stage headliners. In 1979, when Germany's Scorpions played one of their first American live Concerts on the floating stage at Chicagofest, the Chicago Police Department furnished over one hundred patrol men for show security. Admission to the first ChicagoFest held in 1978 was $3.50 in advance and $4 at the gate. The online library  Internet Archive chronicles, from a currently-defunct website, an image of a ChicagoFest rock stage schedule, along with other ChicagoFest memories.

In addition to music, ChicagoFest also featured a cinema at which the premier of The Buddy Holly story attracted Roger Ebert and Gene Siskel, The Premier of MTV was mounted at ChicagoFest, A Laser Light Show, The Mike Douglas Show originated at ChicagoFest, 100 local food vendors sales grossing ten million dollars annually.
As the festival grew over the years, it attracted roughly 100,000 visitors per day, and approximately 1,000,000 people attended Navy Pier for the fest. The idea for ChicagoFest was taken from Milwaukee's Summerfest. by the special events office of Mayor Bilandic who hired the staff from Milwaukee. That staff - formed as Festivals Inc. included food managers Tom and Bill Drilias, entertainment producers Jerry Weintraub Jr and Lou Volpano, and public relations maestro Joseph Pecor. The success of the festival led to the creation of the Taste of Chicago, Loop Alive's restoration of the Chicago Theatre, and other event at Navy Pier such as Art Expo Chicago.

Politics
Jane Byrne became mayor in 1979 and attempted to cancel ChicagoFest. However, a public relations campaign mounted by the Chicago Tribune and Labor Unions gained enough support to convince Byrne to reverse her decision. In 1982, after black Chicago residents were angered by Mayor Byrne's nomination of three white board members to new positions in the Chicago Housing Authority, Jesse Jackson and other civil rights leaders called for a boycott of ChicagoFest. Stevie Wonder and over one hundred other local black entertainers cancelled their scheduled appearances, and a picket line was set up outside the festival.

References

Music festivals in Chicago
History of Chicago
Defunct music festivals
Recurring events established in 1978
Recurring events disestablished in 1983